Heliura thysbe is a moth of the subfamily Arctiinae. It was described by Heinrich Benno Möschler in 1877. It is found in Suriname.

References

Arctiinae
Moths described in 1877